Whernside is a mountain in the Yorkshire Dales in Northern England. It is the highest of the Yorkshire Three Peaks, the other two being Ingleborough and Pen-y-ghent. It is the highest point in the ceremonial county of North Yorkshire and the historic West Riding of Yorkshire with the summit lying on the county boundary with Cumbria. It is the fifteenth most prominent hill in England.

In shape Whernside forms a long ridge, running roughly north-north-east to south-south-west.

Name 
The name, first recorded in 1208 as Querneside, is of Old English origin.  It is derived from cweorn 'quern' or 'millstone' and sīde 'hillside', so means "hillside where millstones are found".  The name is of the same origin as Great Whernside,  to the east, with which it is sometimes confused.

Routes
There is a public footpath from  Ribblehead that heads north via Smithy Hill and Grain Ings before turning west to Knoutberry Haw and then south to Whernside itself. From the summit the right of way heads initially south, then steeply south-east down a stepped path to the area known as Bruntscar. If climbed as part of the Yorkshire Three Peaks Challenge (which is normally done anti-clockwise) Whernside is climbed following the route up from Ribblehead to descend to Bruntscar.

There are, however, other routes up/down the mountain which are not rights of way but instead make use of open access land. A path heads directly west from the triangulation pillar to reach Deepdale Lane near White Shaw Moss. An alternative route heads directly north across Knoutberry Haw to pass Whernside Tarns and reaches the Craven Way at Boot of the Wold.

Walkers should select this route with care as it is no longer maintained, boggy, badly eroded and requires extreme care over the steep ascent/descent.

Alfred Wainwright in his 1970 Walks in Limestone Country describes three walks titled "Ascent of Whernside":  a  route from Ingleton, up the southwest ridge and returning via Ellerbeck, which he describes as "an exhilarating walk, a tonic for jaded minds, and a splendid exercise for the legs"; a  route from Dent (alternatively,  from a car parked nearer), following what is now the Dales High Way route onto the ridge and descending steeply west to Deepdale, "a fine walk on a fine day with excellent views ... the best of all routes up Whernside because of the lovely countryside from which it springs"; and the  ascent from Ribblehead, via Force Gill with a direct return via Winterscales.

Notes

References

External links

 Computer generated summit panoramas Whernside index
 Photos of Whernside and surrounding area on geograph.org.uk
 Walk up Whernside from Ribblehead Viaduct
 Listing on Peakbagger.com

Marilyns of England
Hewitts of England
Peaks of the Yorkshire Dales
Mountains and hills of Cumbria
Nuttalls
Sites of Special Scientific Interest in North Yorkshire
Yorkshire Three Peaks
Highest points of English counties